Resucitar (English: "Resurrect") is the seventh studio album by Peruvian singer-songwriter Gian Marco released by Sony Music Latin and Crescent Moon Records on July 20, 2004. It was his second album to be released internationally.
It was his last album under a major music label and since then he's been successful as an independent artist.

Commercial performance
Like Gian Marco's previous album,  this album was a success throughout Latin America and parts of Europe. Its lead single of the same name entered the U.S. billboard charts and the album earned Gian Marco his first Latin Grammy Award in 2005. This was Gian Marco's fifth nomination at the Latin Grammys.

Critical reception

Besides getting good acceptance from the public and the recording academy, the album also received a 3.5 rating on AllMusic

Tour
In order to promote the album, Gian Marco embarked on his Resucitar Tour 2004 throughout the American continent where the album's singles were having airplay success.

Track listing
All credits adapted from AllMusic.

Accolades
6th Latin Grammy Awards

|-
| style="text-align:center;"|2005
| style="text-align:center;"|Resucitar
|style="text-align:center;"|Best Singer-Songwriter Album
|
|-

Premios Luces El Comercio

|-
| rowspan=2 style="text-align:center;"|2005
| style="text-align:center;"|Resucitar
|style="text-align:center;"|Best Pop Album
|
|-
| style="text-align:center;"|Himself
|style="text-align:center;"|Best Pop Artist
|
|-

References

Peruvian music
2004 albums
Spanish-language albums
Latin Grammy Award for Best Singer-Songwriter Album